The Women's elimination race at the UEC European Track Championships was first competed in 2015 in Grenchen, Switzerland.

The elimination race, also known colloquially as "the Devil" (from the idiom "devil take the hindmost"), is a race in which at the end of every second lap the last rider to cross the line is eliminated from the race. The final two cyclists then take part in what amounts to a rolling start match sprint. Although included in the omnium for several years, its first stand alone appearance was in 2015.

Kirsten Wild is the most successful cyclist in this event, with three European titles for the Netherlands.

Medalists

References

 
Women's elimination race
Women's elimination race